Bushia is a genus of saltwater clams in the family Thraciidae.

 Bushia elegans (Dall, 1886)
 Bushia rushii (Pilsbry, 1897)

References

External links 

 
 Bushia at the World Register of Marine Species (WoRMS)

Thraciidae
Bivalve genera